Montels may refer to the following places in France:

Montels, Ariège, a commune in the Ariège department 
Montels, Hérault, a commune in the Hérault department 
Montels, Tarn, a commune in the Tarn department

oc:Montelhs (Arièja)